David Hemenway (born 1945) is a Professor of Health Policy at the Harvard School of Public Health.  He has a B.A. (1966) and Ph.D. (1974) from Harvard University in economics. He is the director of the Harvard Injury Control Research Center and the Harvard Youth Violence Prevention Center. He is also currently a James Marsh Visiting Professor-at-Large at the University of Vermont. Hemenway has written over 130 articles and five books in the fields of economics and public health.

Research
Hemenway began his research in the field of injury prevention in the 1960s, when he helped investigate product safety for Ralph Nader as one of "Nader's Raiders". Since then, he has become well known for studying gun violence and how it can be prevented.

Books
His most recent book is While We Were Sleeping: Success Stories in Injury and Violence Prevention (2009). Private Guns, Public Health (2006) describes the public health approach to reducing firearm violence, and summarizes scientific research on firearms and health.

Prices and Choices (1993) is a collection of twenty-six of his essays applying microeconomic theory to everyday life.  Monitoring and Compliance: the Political Economy of Inspection (1985) describes the importance of inspection processes in ensuring that regulations are followed, and the reasons the system often fails.  Industry-wide Voluntary Product Standards (1975) describes the role of voluntary standards and standardization in the U.S. economy.

An early statistics article, Why Your Classes are Larger than Average, has been anthologized in various mathematical collections.

Other

Hemenway appeared at a forum hosted by the Robert Wood Johnson foundation and made the following statement in April 2013, "Instead of it being the mark of a real man that you can shoot somebody at 50 feet and kill them with a gun, the mark of a real man is that you would never do anything like that. . . . The gun is a great equalizer because it makes wimps as dangerous as people who really have skill and bravery and so I’d like to have this notion that anyone using a gun is a wuss. They aren’t anybody to be looked up to. They’re somebody to look down at because they couldn’t defend themselves or couldn’t protect others without using a gun."

References

 (General reference for this page) Harvard Injury Control Center Director webpage

External links

 Harvard University Faculty Page
 

1945 births
Living people
Gun politics in the United States
Harvard University alumni
Harvard University faculty
American gun control activists
Gun violence researchers
Economists from Massachusetts
21st-century American economists